Btissam Sadini (or Ibtissam Sadini, born 9 February 1998) is a Moroccan karateka. She won one of the bronze medals in the women's kumite 61 kg event at the 2018 World Karate Championships held in Madrid, Spain.

Career 

In 2018, she won silver medal in the African Championship in Rwanda.

In 2019, she represented Morocco at the 2019 African Games and she won one of the bronze medals in the women's kumite 61 kg event. She also won the gold medal in the women's team kumite event.

In 2019, she won the bronze medal in the African Championship in Gaborone, Botswana.

In 2020, she won the silver medal in African Championship in Tangier, Morocco.

In 2021, she qualified at the World Olympic Qualification Tournament held in Paris, France to compete at the 2020 Summer Olympics in Tokyo, Japan. She competed in the women's 61 kg event. She was also the flag bearer for Morocco during the closing ceremony.

Achievements

References

External links

 
 
 

 

Living people
Moroccan female karateka
African Games medalists in karate
African Games gold medalists for Morocco
African Games bronze medalists for Morocco
Competitors at the 2019 African Games
1998 births
Karateka at the 2020 Summer Olympics
Olympic karateka of Morocco
21st-century Moroccan women